Roger B. Taney was a justice of the United States Supreme Court. Roger B. Taney may also refer to:

 Roger B. Taney Monument (Annapolis)
 Roger B. Taney Monument (Baltimore)